Espy may refer to:

People 

 Ben Espy, Ohio politician
 Cecil Espy (born 1963), American baseball player
 Chuck Espy (born 1975), American politician
 Duane Espy (born 1952), American baseball figure
 Espy Pilgrim, murder victim
 Espy Van Horne (1795–1829), Pennsylvania politician
 Gene Espy, hiker
 Henry Espy, American politician
 James Pollard Espy (1785–1860), American meteorologist
 M. Watt Espy (1933–2009), historian
 Mike Espy (born 1953), American politician
 Willard R. Espy (1910–1999), American writer
 William Gray Espy (born 1948), American actor

Places
 Espy Bog, wetland complex in Columbia County, Pennsylvania
 Espy House, a historic house in Bedford, Pennsylvania
 Espy Run, a tributary of Nanticoke Creek in Luzerne County
 Espy, Pennsylvania, a census-designated place in Columbia County, Pennsylvania, United States

Other
 ESPY Awards, an annual awards ceremony by ESPN
 Espy Sans, a font created by Apple Computer
 ESPY (film), a 1974 Japanese film adaptation of Sakyo Komatsu's novel
 ESPY Photo Award, a biennial international photography competition

See also
 The Espy, a nickname of Esplanade Hotel (Melbourne)
 e-spy (electronic spy), concerning electronic intelligence and cyberespionage